The 2015 Belarusian First League is the 25th season of 2nd level football in Belarus. It started in April and finished in November 2015.

Team changes from 2014 season
Two best teams of 2014 Belarusian First League (Granit Mikashevichi and Slavia Mozyr) were promoted to Belarusian Premier League. No team has relegated from Premier League directly due to its expansion from 12 to 14 clubs.

Last season's third-placed team Vitebsk won the promotion/relegation play-offs against Dnepr Mogilev (last team of Premier League) and were also promoted to Premier League. Dnepr Mogilev replaced Vitebsk in the First League

Volna Pinsk, who finished 16th last year, relegated to the Second League. To compensate for Premier League expansion, they were replaced by three best teams of 2014 Second League (Baranovichi, Krumkachy Minsk and Orsha).

Before the start of the season, FC Minsk announced that their farm-club Minsk-2 will be folded. Kobrin, who finished 5th in 2014 Second League, were invited to replace Minsk-2 (after Zhlobin, who finished 4th in Second League, declined invitation).

Teams summary

League table

Results

Top goalscorers

Updated to games played on 15 November 2015 Source: football.by

See also
2015 Belarusian Premier League
2014–15 Belarusian Cup
2015–16 Belarusian Cup

External links
 Official site 

Belarusian First League seasons
2
Belarus
Belarus